The 1968 Chatham Cup was the 41st annual nationwide knockout football competition in New Zealand.

Early stages of the competition were run on a regional basis. In all, 93 teams took part in the competition. Note: Different sources give different numberings for the rounds of the competition: some start round one with the beginning of the regional qualifications; others start numbering from the first national knock-out stage. The former numbering scheme is used in this article.

The 1968 final
The final was a one-sided affair, with Suburbs proving too strong for the southerners. John Wrathall scored both goals in the final, putting the ball past Tech keeper (and future national team coach) Ian Marshall.

Results

Third Round

* Mount Albert won on corners

Fourth Round

Fifth Round

* Roslyn-Wakari won on corners

Quarter-finals

Semi-finals

Final

References

Rec.Sport.Soccer Statistics Foundation New Zealand 1968 page
UltimateNZSoccer website 1968 Chatham Cup page

Chatham Cup
Chatham Cup
Chatham Cup
September 1968 sports events in New Zealand